Vasum capitellum, common name the helmet vase, is a species of medium to large sea snail, a marine gastropod mollusk in the family Turbinellidae.

Shell description
The length of the shell varies between 33 mm and 79.6 mm.

Distribution
This marine species occurs in the Caribbean Sea.

Fossils have been found in Quaternary strata of the Dominican Republic (age range:  2.588 to 0.012 Ma)

References

 A. J. W. Hendy, D. P. Buick, K. V. Bulinski, C. A. Ferguson, and A. I. Miller. 2008. Unpublished census data from Atlantic coastal plain and circum-Caribbean Neogene assemblages and taxonomic opinions.

External links
Linnaeus, C. (1758). Systema Naturae per regna tria naturae, secundum classes, ordines, genera, species, cum characteribus, differentiis, synonymis, locis. Editio decima, reformata (10th revised edition), vol. 1: 824 pp. Laurentius Salvius: Holmiae.
 Perry, G. (1811). Conchology, or the natural history of shells: containing a new arrangement of the genera and species, illustrated by coloured engravings executed from the natural specimens, and including the latest discoveries. 4 pp., 61 plates. London. 
 Lamarck, (J.-B. M.) de. (1822). Histoire naturelle des animaux sans vertèbres. Tome septième. Paris: published by the Author, 711 pp.

capitellum
Gastropods described in 1758